Aradhana Seth is an Indian art director, artist, production designer and filmmaker who has worked in the Hindi film industry as well as for Hollywood productions like Wes Anderson's The Darjeeling Limited, London Has Fallen and The Bourne Supremacy. As an artist, Seth has exhibited her works at Chemould Prescott Road Gallery, Grosvenor Gallery, KHOJ New Delhi. Seth also produced the 2020 BBC adaptation of her brother, Vikram Seth's novel A Suitable Boy. She is based in Goa, India.

Family
Seth's mother was the Indian Chief Justice Leila Seth, and her brothers are the novelist Vikram Seth and the Buddhist teacher Shantum Seth.

Selected filmography
Seth has been involved in art direction or production design for:
The Bourne Supremacy (2004) - art department (India unit)
Don: The Chase Begins Again (2006) - production designer
The Darjeeling Limited (2007) - art director
London Has Fallen (2016) - art director
The Sky Is Pink (2018) - production design

References

External links

Living people
Indian art directors
Artists from Goa
Indian women artists
Indian production designers
Year of birth missing (living people)